Kingaby is a surname. Notable people with the surname include:

Donald Kingaby (1920–1990), Royal Air Force officer
Herbert Kingaby (1880–1934), British footballer

English-language surnames